Yen Vien station is a railway station in Vietnam. It serves the city of Hanoi.

References

Railway stations in Hanoi